Ghorpuri railway station is located in Indian city of Pune. It serves Ghorpuri (a suburban area of Pune city). Very few trains currently halt here. It is about 3.5 km from Pune Junction. Currently all passenger trains and some express trains have a scheduled halt at Ghorpuri. Just beside the station is located a diesel locomotive maintenance shed housing more than 200 locomotives for Express trains from Pune and goods trains.

References

See also
 
 
 
 Pune Suburban Railway

Railway stations in Pune